Sulo Jääskeläinen (19 December 1890 – 12 January 1942) was a Finnish skier. He was born in Viipuri. He participated at the 1924 Winter Olympics in  Chamonix, where he placed 11th in ski jumping and 16th in Nordic combined.

References

External links

1890 births
1942 deaths
Sportspeople from Vyborg
People from Viipuri Province (Grand Duchy of Finland)
Finnish male ski jumpers
Finnish male Nordic combined skiers
Olympic ski jumpers of Finland
Olympic Nordic combined skiers of Finland
Ski jumpers at the 1924 Winter Olympics
Nordic combined skiers at the 1924 Winter Olympics
20th-century Finnish people